The 1958–59 season was Cardiff City F.C.'s 32nd season in the Football League. They competed in the 22-team Division Two, then the second tier of English football, finishing ninth.

Players

League standings

Results by round

Fixtures and results

Second Division

FA Cup

Welsh Cup

See also
List of Cardiff City F.C. seasons

References

Welsh Football Data Archive

Cardiff City F.C. seasons
Association football clubs 1958–59 season
Card